Topcoder Open (TCO) is an annual design, software development, data science and competitive programming championship, organized by Topcoder, and hosted in different venues around US. In the first two years, 2001 and 2002, the tournament was titled TopCoder Invitational.

In addition to the main championship, from 2001 to 2007 Topcoder was organizing an annual TopCoder Collegiate Challenge tournament, for college students only. Also from 2007 to 2010 TopCoder High School competition was held.

From 2015, Topcoder Regional events are held through the year in different countries.

In 2020–2023 in-person Topcoder Open finals were cancelled, and replaced by virtual events due to the impact of COVID-19 pandemic, and subsequent economic slowdown. It has been announced that the 2023 Topcoder Open edition will sunset traditional TCO events.

Competition tracks 

Competition tracks included in Topcoder Open tournament changed through its history. Many of them resemble the types of challenges offered to Topcoder Community through the year, but there is no 1:1 match. Here is the alphabetical list of all competition tracks ever present at TCO:

Algorithm Competition (SRM) 
Timeline: 2001 – nowadays

Champions:  Gennady Korotkevich tourist (2022, 2021, 2020, 2019, 2014);  Petr Mitrichev Petr (2018, 2015, 2013, 2006);  Yuhao Du xudyh (2017);  Makoto Soejima rng_58 (2016, 2011, 2010);  Egor Kulikov Egor (2012);  Bin Jin crazyb0y (2009);   tomek (2008, 2004, 2003);  Jan Kuipers Jan_Kuipers (2007);   Eryx (2005);  John Dethridge John Dethridge (2002);  jonmac (2001).

Details:

The only track that was present at all main TCOs events, and at most of the other Topcoder events. Follows the format of regular 1.5 hours Single Round Matches:

 The Coding Phase – 75 mins: All competitors are presented with the same three algorithmic problems of different complexity, each problem has its own maximal number of points. Problem descriptions are initially invisible. Competitors have 75 minutes to solve these problems. Competitor can open any problem description in any order; once he opened a problem, the number of points he can get for the correct solution of that problem starts decreasing over time. When competitor submits problem solution (a code that successfully compiles), he is awarded with the current number of points he can get for that problem. He can re-submit a solution, getting the further decrease number of points, minus extra penalty for the resubmission. During the phase competitors can see the current points awarded to each participant, but they don't know whether solutions of those participants are correct or wrong, thus whether these scores will hold after The System Testing Phase, or will be reset.
 The Challenge Phase – 15 mins: Each competitor can see all submission done by other competitors. He can (optionally) challenge any of them, submitting test cases that will cause other competitor's submission produce a wrong result. Submission of correct challenge test case gives submitter 50 points award, submission of an incorrect test case (i.e. the challenged solution can solve it successfully) will lead to 25 points penalty for the test case submitter.
 The System Testing Phase – In the last phase system tests are automatically executed for all submissions from all competitors. If a submission fails testing, the scores awarded for that submission during The Coding Phase are reset to zero. The final scores after the system testing determine the winner.

Data Science 
Timeline: 2023

First to Finish (F2F) 
Timeline: 2009 – 2014, 2016 – 2022

Champions:  Fatih Tas neonray (2022);  Thomas Kranitsas thomaskranitsas (2021);  Victor Roberto Gomes da Cunha cunhavictor (2020);  Dilip Kumar Thapa veshu (2019);  Dmitry Kondakov kondakovdmitry (2018);  Akinwale Ariwodola akinwale (2017, 2014);  vvvpig (2016);  Pratap Koritala supercharger (2013);  Lan Luo hohosky (2012);  Yang Li Yeung (2011);  Margaryta Skrypachova Margarita (2010);  Ninghai Huang PE (2009).

Details:

Officially called as Mod Dash from 2009 to 2013, and First2Finish afterwards. Competitors are provided with set of small programming tasks (like bug fixes / enhancements in an existing codebase), and they get scores based on who correctly resolves each task first. The exact rules for on-site competition may vary from year to year.

Information Architecture 
Timeline: 2015 only.

Champions:  Silvana Vacchina f0rc0d3r (2015).

Details:

Provided with client requirements for a software product, competitors are asked to create a wireframe mockup of the future app / website.

Marathon Match (MM) 
Timeline: 2007 – nowadays

Champions:    Psyho (2022, 2017, 2016, 2014, 2013, 2011, 2008);  Catalin-Stefan Tiseanu CatalinT (2021); Hironao Tsutsumida iehn (2020);  Gennady Korotkevich tourist (2019, 2018);  Tiancheng Lou ACRush (2015);  Won-Seok Yoo ainu7 (2012);  Yoichi Iwata wata (2010);  Andrey Lopatin KOTEHOK (2009);  Mateusz Zotkiewicz Mojito1 (2007).

Details:

Officially called as just Marathon from 2007 to nowadays. Follows the format of regular MM competitions (a 1–2 weeks long online, and 1 day long during on-site competitions). Competitors are provided with the same algorithmic / data science problem, which is judged objectively with a live leaderboard, visible to everybody. Everybody can submit multiple times with no penalties, with the goal to come up with a code that scores the maximal possible amount of scores on that problem. During the competition the leaderboard is generated based on submissions testing against a limit number of test cases, and after the contest the final results are determined in a testing against a larger test dataset.

Quality Assurance Competition (QA) 
Timeline: 2019 – nowadays

Champions:  Nuwan Gunarathne codejam (2022, 2021, 2020);  Vladimir Timofejev v.t. (2019)

Details:

The QA competition includes: structured and unstructured testing, structured test case writing, and automated testing.

Software Design 
Timeline: 2004–2014

Champions:  Meng Wang albertwang (2014, 2013);  Michael Paweska argolite (2012, 2010);  WuJian Ye BLE (2011);  Olexiy Sadovnikov saarixx (2009);  Tim Roberts Pops (2008, 2006);  Sergey Kalinchenko kyky (2007);  Nikolay Archak nicka81 (2005);  Adrian Carcu adic (2004).

Details:

Officially called as Component Design from 2004 to 2009, and just Design from 2010 to 2014. Competitors were asked to take client requirements for a software component / product as input, and produce development documentation / technical specifications. Solutions were evaluated by a panel of judges according to objective scorecards.

Software Development 
Timeline: 2004 – nowadays

Champions:  xxcxy (2022);  Jiang Liwu jiangliwu (2021, 2019);  Dr. Sergey Pogodin birdofpreyru (2020, 2017);  Ngoc Pham ngoctay (2018);  Łukasz Sentkiewicz Sky_ (2016, 2015, 2014);  Zhijie Liu morehappiness (2013);  Yang Li Yeung (2012, 2010);  Franklin Guevarra j3_guile (2011);  GuanZhuo Jin Standlove (2009 – Architecture, 2004);  Pablo Wolfus pulky (2009 – Assembly);  Yanbo Wu assistant (2009 – Component Development);  Piotr Paweska AleaActaEst (2009 – Specification);  Romano Silva romanoTC (2008);  Feng He hefeng (2007);  Sindunata Sudarmagi sindu (2006);  Qi Liu visualage (2005).

Details:

Officially called as Component Development from 2004 to 2009, and just as Development from 2010 to nowadays. The actual rules differ from year to year, but, typically, competitors are presented with technical specifications for development of a software component / application / tool, or with a more open, hackathon-style requirements, which they must implement in the best possible way in 4 hours. Submitted solutions are evaluated by a panel of judges according to objective scorecards.

UI Design 
Timeline: 2007 – nowadays

Champions:  Teeraporn Sriponpak iamtong (2022, 2021, 2020, 2018, 2012);  L. O. I. (2019);  Panji Kharisma kharm (2017);  Junius Albertho abedavera (2016, 2015, 2013, 2011);  Faridah Amalia Mandaga fairy_ley (2014);  Tri Joko Rubiyanto djackmania (2010);  Dale Napier djnapier (2009);  Nino Rey Ronda oninkxronda (2008);  Yiming Liao yiming (2007).

Details:

The event was officially called Studio from 2007 to 2014, and UI Design from 2015 onwards. Competitors, provided with client requirements, are asked to create the best UI (visual) design for an software product.

UI Prototype 
Timeline: 2015–2018

Champions:  Mouly Gunarathne moulyg (2018, 2017, 2016);  Dileepa Balasuriya dileepa (2015).

Details:

Competitors are provided with design specifications for a website / web-application, and they should create a working prototype of the frontend within a ~4 hours timeframe. The resulting submissions are judged against objective scorecards.

List of Topcoder Open events 
These are the main Topcoder Open events, where champions are determined.

Topcoder Open victories by countries represented by champions

Notes

References 

Programming contests